The Käthe Leichter Prize is the Austrian State Prize for women's research, gender studies and gender equality in the workplace.

History 
The prize, founded in 1991, was created on the initiative of the historian Herbert Steiner, who was assisted by Minister of Women's Affairs, Johanna Dohnal. It is named after the Social Democratic politician Käthe Leichter (1895-1942), who was murdered. 
The award, which was originally endowed with the title of "State Prize for the Women's History of the Workers and Workers' Movement", is awarded annually by the Ministry of Women and the Ministry of Social Affairs to two women. The jury decides on the award of the prize.

Winners 
The winners of the prize have included:

References 

Austrian awards
Awards honoring women
Gender studies awards